Racing Club Valderiès XIII are a French Rugby league club based in Valderiès, Tarn in the Midi-Pyrénées region. The club plays in the Midi-Pyrénées League in the French National Division 2.

See also
National Division 2

External links
Club Website

French rugby league teams
1971 establishments in France
Rugby clubs established in 1971